Sukho is a Union Council of Gujar Khan, Rawalpindi District, Punjab, Pakistan. It is located 3.5 km south of the Sukho Mor stop at the Mandra-Chakwal Road and is connected with Gujar Khan (12.5 km) via Sukho-Gujar Khan Road.

Education 
Other than private schools, the town has a number of government schools:
 Government Boys Primary School Sukho
 Government Islamia High School Sukho (for Boys)
 Government Girls High School Sukho

Health Facilities 
Sukho has a Basic Health Unit (BHU) located on the outskirts of the town toward the North-West. It provides basic health services free of cost, including maternity related services.

The town also has several private clinics and medical doctors providing basic health related services. A local pharma enterprise known as Kamal Laboratories is situated in the town as well. It is well known to manufacture and export various homeopathic drugs in Pakistan and abroad. The founding unit of the laboratories is located in Sukho since 1967.

Post Office 
Sukho has a post office which provides postal and pension services to the people of area.

Bank 
A branch of Muslim Commercial Bank (MCB) is located near the Lari-Adda. It offers Islamic banking services as well.

References

Populated places in Gujar Khan Tehsil
Union councils of Gujar Khan Tehsil